Corod is a commune in Galați County, Western Moldavia, Romania. It is composed of four villages: Blânzi, Brătulești, Cărăpcești and Corod.

Demography
According to the census conducted in 2011, the population of Corod amounts to 7,334 inhabitants, down from the previous census in 2002, when it had a registered 7,870 inhabitants. Most people (96.36%), are Romanian. The ethnicity for 3.61% of the population is unknown. Most of the inhabitants are Eastern Orthodox (96.06%). For 3.74% of the population the religious affiliation is unknown.

References

Communes in Galați County
Localities in Western Moldavia